Nicholas "Nick" Tritton (born 20 July 1984 in Guelph, Ontario) is a male judoka who grew up in the Perth/Lanark area of Ontario Canada. Nicholas was a member of Canada's National Team for more than ten years and won many medals domestically and internationally including 13 medals on the Grand Slam, Grand Prix and World Cup circuit including back to back bronze medals at the prestigious Tokyo Grand Slam as well as the bronze medal in the men's lightweight division (– 73 kg) at the 2007 Pan American Games, alongside Cuba's Ronald Girones and another bronze at the 2011 Pan American Games in Mexico. He represented Canada in the sport of Judo at the 2008 Summer & 2012 Summer Olympics and at five World Championships. He won 5 medals at the Pan American Judo Championships (bronze in 2007, 2008 & 2011, silver in 2009 and gold in 2010 - missed 2012 due to injury). He also earned a bronze medal at the 2005 Francophone Games and a silver at the 2009 Francophone Games.

He retired from judo competition after the 2012 Olympics due to health and funding issues and then tried his hand at Sambo competition at the urging of the Canadian Sambo Federation. In the sport of Sambo Nick has thus far competed at three events: the 2014 Commonwealth Sambo Championships held in London England where he won an impressive 6 matches to earn gold in his first ever Sambo event, the 2014 President's Cup (a team event) also held in London England at the same time (where he won 3 of 4 matches) and the 2014 World Sambo Championships held in Japan where he placed 7th. Nicholas now runs a private gym in Montreal offering personal training, judo, wrestling and sambo.

See also
Judo in Ontario
Judo in Canada
List of Canadian judoka

References

External links
 Personal homepage (Archived)
 
 

 2012 Olympics -73 kg elimination round of 64 Nicholas Tritton vs. Navruz Jurakobilov (IOC on YouTube)

1984 births
Living people
Canadian male judoka
Judoka at the 2007 Pan American Games
Judoka at the 2008 Summer Olympics
Judoka at the 2011 Pan American Games
Judoka at the 2012 Summer Olympics
Olympic judoka of Canada
Sportspeople from Guelph
Pan American Games bronze medalists for Canada
Pan American Games medalists in judo
Medalists at the 2007 Pan American Games
Medalists at the 2011 Pan American Games